Suvorov Crossing the Alps,  Suvorov's March across the Alps, and other similar titles may refer to the following works of art (in addition to references to the actual event).

A painting by Surikov, see Alexander Suvorov#Suvorov's Italian campaign
A mosaic on the facade of Suvorov's Museum in Saint Petersburg, see Suvorov's Italian and Swiss expedition#Outcome

Russian art